Raúl de Anda (1908–1997) was a Mexican actor, screenwriter, film producer and director. He enjoyed a lengthy and prolific career in the Mexican Cinema that party included its Golden Age.

Selected filmography

Actor
 Juan Pistolas (1936)
 La Valentina (1938)

Producer
 I'm a Real Mexican (1942)
 Red Konga (1943)
 Rosalinda (1945)
 Adventure in the Night (1948)
 Acapulco (1952)

Director
 Angels of the Arrabal (1949)

References

Bibliography
 Pick, M. Zuzana. Constructing the Image of the Mexican Revolution: Cinema and the Archive. University of Texas Press, 2010.

External links

1908 births
1997 deaths
Mexican film producers
Mexican male screenwriters
Mexican male film actors
Male actors from Mexico City
Film directors from Mexico City
Writers from Mexico City
20th-century Mexican screenwriters
20th-century Mexican male writers